Poloz Mukuch is a restaurant and prominent beerhouse in Gyumri, the second-largest city in Armenia. It was opened during the 1960s in Soviet Armenia and located in the historic district of Kumayri. It occupies an old mansion built in the 1860s. The beerhouse is named after humorist Mkrtich Melkonyan (1881-1931), a native of Gyumri, better known as Poloz Mukuch.

History
The building was originally built by Ter-Suqias Meliqyan (was born in 1880 in Ojakhuli  , under Stalin's regime, he was executed in 1937 by a troika of the NKVD (People's Committee of Internal Affairs) and the KGB in Armenia. ), when Gyumri was known as Alexandropol under Imperial Russia. However, the property was nationalized by the Soviet government in 1937. At the beginning of the 1960s, the building was turned into a state-owned beerhouse.

However, the property was privatized in late 1990s and continued to function as a beerhouse. The 130-year old building is well-preserved and still keeping its original traditional design. The bust of Poloz Mukuch was placed at the entrance.

Nowadays, the beerhouse is one of the prominent landmarks of the city of Gyumri.

Gallery

References

Buildings and structures in Shirak Province
Gyumri